The Jinzhou South railway station is a railway station of Qinhuangdao–Shenyang high-speed railway located in People's Republic of China.

References 

Railway stations in Liaoning